The Compass may refer to:

 The Daily Compass, a New York City newspaper published from 1949 to 1952
 Social Work (journal), an academic journal, known from 1920 until 1948 as The Compass

See also
 Compass (disambiguation)